Campofilone is a comune (municipality) in the Province of Fermo in the Italian region Marche, located about  southeast of Ancona and about  northeast of Ascoli Piceno.

Campofilone borders the following municipalities: Altidona, Lapedona, Massignano, Montefiore dell'Aso, Pedaso.

Demographic evolution

References

Cities and towns in the Marche